Pachythrix mniochlora is a moth of the family Noctuidae. It is found in Queensland and Papua New Guinea.

References

External links
Australian Faunal Directory
Image at CSIRO Entomology

Hadeninae
Moths of Australia
Moths of Papua New Guinea
Moths described in 1889
Taxa named by Edward Meyrick